Amina Pirani Maggi (January 15, 1892 – November 10, 1979) was an Italian stage and film actress.

Selected filmography
 Television (1931)
 Seconda B (1934)
 Dimmed Lights (1934)
 Like the Leaves (1935)
 Department Store (1939)
 Guest for One Night (1939)
 A Thousand Lire a Month (1939)
 Beyond Love (1940)
 Lucrezia Borgia (1940)
 Manon Lescaut (1940)
 The King's Jester (1941)
 The Hero of Venice (1941)
 Luisa Sanfelice (1942)
 Girl of the Golden West (1942)
 Love Story (1942)
 Rita of Cascia (1943)
 A Living Statue (1943)
 The Innocent Casimiro (1945)
 Be Seeing You, Father (1948)
 Ring Around the Clock (1950)
 The Beggar's Daughter (1950)
 Who Is Without Sin (1952)
 If You Won a Hundred Million (1953)
 The Knight of the Black Sword (1956)

References

Bibliography 
 Waldman, Harry. Missing Reels: Lost Films of American and European Cinema. McFarland, 2000.

External links 
 

1892 births
1979 deaths
Italian stage actresses
Italian film actresses
Actors from Verona